Krebsbach is a river in Baden-Württemberg, Germany. It is a left tributary of the Schwarzbach near Waibstadt.

References

See also
List of rivers of Baden-Württemberg

Rivers of Baden-Württemberg
Rivers of Germany